Dextellia is a genus of moths in the family Gracillariidae.

Species
Dextellia dorsilineella  (Amsel, 1935)

References

External links
Global Taxonomic Database of Gracillariidae (Lepidoptera) 

Gracillariinae
Gracillarioidea genera
Monotypic moth genera